Arthur City is an unincorporated community in Lamar County, Texas, United States.

The North Lamar Independent School District serves area students.

Its US Postal Service ZIP Code is 75411.

External links
 Handbook of Texas Online
 

Unincorporated communities in Texas
Unincorporated communities in Lamar County, Texas